Jianglangshan or Mount Jianglang is a mountain in Jiangshan, Zhejiang, China. Three peaks from north to south make its recognizable "river-shaped" arrangement, as follows: Lang Feng, Ya Feng and Ling Feng.

The mountain exhibits Danxia landform, and was inscribed onto the World Heritage List in August 2010 as part of China Danxia.

In September 2013, Mount Jianglang was the scene for a stunt by Jeb Corliss where he flew between two of the peaks in a wingsuit, starting the jump from a helicopter.

References

Danxia landform
Mountains of Zhejiang
Jiangshan